Womblebank is a rural locality in the Maranoa Region, Queensland, Australia.

Womblebank's postcode is 4465.

References 

Maranoa Region
Localities in Queensland